Merrick Thomson (born September 9, 1983) is a former professional lacrosse player from Hamilton, Ontario. He played the attack position for the Hamilton Nationals of  Major League Lacrosse and for the Philadelphia Wings of the National Lacrosse League.

College career
Thomson played collegiate lacrosse at the University at Albany.  He was co-captain of the Great Danes, alongside Frank Resetarits, and helped lead his team to the NCAA Men's Lacrosse Championship tournament as a senior.   Thomson made an immediate impact in the NCAA.  As a freshman, he equaled the NCAA single game record of playoff goals scored, with six, in a contest against the Syracuse Orangemen, earning America East Conference Rookie of the Year in 2004. In 2005, he led the nation in goals scored per game, with 3.38 per game, and in 2007 was named an All-American (third-team).

Professional career

MLL
Thomson played in Major League Lacrosse with the New Jersey Pride.  In limited playing time as a rookie, Thomson impressed, and has proved himself a valuable asset in the future to the Pride. In 2008, his second season in the league, Thomson scored 42 goals (finishing with the second most on the season) and was awarded the Warrior Most Improved Player award. During the 2009 MLL season Thomson played for the Toronto Nationals. Thomson had a career high in goals with 44. He then helped lead Toronto to the MLL Championship and won the MVP award for the playoffs.

NLL
Thomson was selected in the first round (second overall) by the Philadelphia Wings of the National Lacrosse League in the 2007 NLL Entry Draft.  A consensus first round draft pick, the Wings chose Thomson to strengthen their left-handed offensive attack.  Thomson captured Rookie of the Week honors in week 4 of the 2008 NLL season, and also was named Rookie of the Month for January. In two seasons in Philadelphia, Thomson picked up 124 points.

Retirement
Thompson suffered a concussion during the 2009 MLL championship game. The injury sidelined Thomson for the entire 2010 NLL season with the Wings.  He was also placed on Injury Reserve for the 2010 MLL season with the Nationals. In April 2011, Thomson announced that he would not return to professional lacrosse, due to post-concussion symptoms.

Awards
2004 – America East Conference Rookie of the Year  
 2007 USILA Division I All-American
 2008 Major League Lacrosse Most Improved Player of the Year Award

Statistics

NCAA (Division I)

 (a) 5th on NCAA career goals list

Major League Lacrosse

National Lacrosse League

References

1983 births
Living people
Albany Great Danes men's lacrosse players
Canadian lacrosse players
Lacrosse people from Ontario
Major League Lacrosse players
Philadelphia Wings players
Sportspeople from Hamilton, Ontario
Hamilton Nationals players